Henri-Marc Ami (November 23, 1858 – January 4, 1931) was a French Canadian archaeologist responsible for the initial excavation of Combe-Capelle from the years of 1926 until his death in 1931.

In 1899–1901 he was president of the Ottawa Field-Naturalists' Club. In 1900 he was elected to the Royal Society of Canada.

Dr. Ami is buried at Beechwood Cemetery.

Early life 
Born in 1858, the son of a Swiss pastor, he studied at McGill University under Professor John William Dawson.

References

 Henri-Marc Ami at The Canadian Encyclopedia

1858 births
1931 deaths
Canadian archaeologists
Fellows of the Royal Society of Canada